XHMLO-FM is a radio station in Malinalco, State of Mexico. Broadcasting on 104.9 FM, XHMLO is owned by Grupo Siete and is known as Crystal.

History

XHMLO received its concession on October 21, 1994.

In 2017, XHMLO and XHEDT-FM in Toluca became the last Grupo Siete-owned stations to ditch the Bengala grupera format and moved to Crystal.

References

Radio stations in the State of Mexico